Joan Hollobon , (b. 1920) is a Welsh-born Canadian writer and journalist best known for her progressive medical reporting for Globe and Mail. She was made an Officer of the Order of Canada (2019) in recognition of her impact on the relationship between medical professionals and the media.

Early life and education

Joan May Hollobon on the Isle of Wight in 1920. An only child, she grew up near and attended school in Rhyl, Wales. During World War II Hollobon volunteered as a administrative and press officer with the British Red Cross. In 1946 she moved to Berlin where she worked as a British secretary for the Allied Control Commission. 

Hollobon first travelled to Canada in 1949 on a visitor's visa but had trouble finding stable employment. She left for England, where she worked for Reader's Digest writing letters. Returning to Canada in 1951, Hollobon moved to Kirkland Lake, Ontario where she landed a job with the Kirkland Lake Northern News.

Career
Hollobon worked for the Kirkland Lake Northern News from 1952 to 1953. She worked as women's editor before becoming a general reporter, covering news related to the mining industry. From 1954 to 1956 she wrote for the North Bay Nugget . Judge J.A.S. Plouffe recognized Hollobon's "just and accurate reporting" of police commission meetings at a send off from the newspaper, ahead of her departure for a position at The Globe and Mail. 

After joining The Globe and Mail in 1956, Hollobon worked as a general assignment reporter. One of her early pieces covered remarks made by Jewish labour activist Kalmen Kaplansky at the Ontario Federation's of Labor's Human Rights Conference in December of that year regarding employment discrimination based on religion. In 1959, she took over medical reporting for the newspaper. The role had previously been held by David Spurgeon. 

Hollobon began reporting on medical issues at a time when medical professionals wanted little to do with journalists. She told reporter Paula Arab that "[i]n those days, Canadian scientists and doctors considered it virtually unethical to talk to the press at all." In 1962, Hollobon covered the Saskatchewan doctors' strike during which physicians vowed to close their practices if Medicare became law. Her series on the events was later reprinted by The Globe and Mail as a booklet titled  “Bungle, Truce and Trouble”. In the 1970s Hollobon was among the fist to report on transgender people and their experience pursuing sex reassignment surgery, at the time reported as sex-change operations. 

Beyond her writing for The Globe and Mail, Hollobon helped found the Canadian Science Writers' Association in 1971. She joined the Toronto branch of the Canadian Women's Press Club in 1968 and served for a time as treasurer. Hollobon was also once a contributing editor for the Journal of Addition Research Foundation of Ontario.

Hollobon retired from The Globe and Mail in 1985.

Honours
In 1990 Hollobon, along with Toronto Star reporter Marilyn Dunlop, was awarded the Royal Canadian Institute's Sandford Fleming Award.  Hollobon was named an Officer of the Order of Canada on December 28, 2019. The citation for the honor noted her "influenced how physicians interact with their patients and the public on a daily basis." In 2022 the National Newspaper Awards's Beat Reporting award was named after  Joan Hollobon for establishing "what beat reporting should be".

Publications

References

External links
 

 Officers of the Order of Canada
 1920 births
Canadian people of Welsh descent
Canadian women journalists